Daniel Scholten (born 1973) is a German writer specialising in Scandinavian languages as well as ancient languages. He hosts the video-podcast series Belles Lettres on German linguistics.

Background 
Upon graduating from school and completing an apprenticeship, Scholten worked in Scandinavia for several years as a typographer. After this, Scholten studied at the Ludwig-Maximilians-Universität in München, with majors in Egyptology and historical linguistics, specialising in the language and literature of ancient Egypt.

Beyond this, Scholten has also been involved with Scandinavian literature (primarily in Icelandic and Swedish) and published two literature journals.

In 2007, Scholten began writing crime novels under the title Kommissar Cederström.

Scholten founded the video-podcast series Belles Lettres in 2010 which focuses on linguistics and stylistics.

Scholte has lived since 2012 in Stockholm and Munich.

Selection of works

As author 
 Novels
 Der zweite Tod. Ein Fall um Kommissar Cederström. Goldmann, München 2007, 
 Die falsche Tote. Ein Fall für Kommissar Cederström. Goldmann, München 2008, 
 Der kopflose Engel. Ein Fall für Kommissar Cederström. Goldmann, München 2008, 
 Der Name der Dunkelheit. Ein Fall für Kommissar Cederström. Goldmann, München 2009, 
 Scientific literature
 Einführung in die isländische Grammatik. Ein Lehrbuch für Anfänger und Fortgeschrittene. Philyra-Verlag, München 2000, 
 Paradigmenfinder zur isländischen Grammatik. Alle Flexionsformen schnell bestimmt. Philyra-Verlag, München 2001,

As editor 
 Íslenska. Zeitschrift für isländische Sprache und Literatur, Jg. 1 (2004), .
 Ida. Schwedische Sprache und Literatur, Band 1 (2006), .

References

External links
 Website von Daniel Scholten
 Belles Lettres Video-Tutorials von Daniel Scholten zu Grammatikfragen

1973 births
Living people
German crime fiction writers
German people of Icelandic descent
German male writers
Linguists from Germany
Ludwig Maximilian University of Munich alumni
Old Norse studies scholars
Scandinavian studies scholars